Platynota islameconae is a species of moth   of the family Tortricidae. It is found in California in the United States.

References

Moths described in 2012
Platynota (moth)